The Sin may refer to:

The Sin (1965 film), an Egyptian drama film
The Sin (2005 film), a Thai film
Bianco, rosso e... (internationally released as The Sin), a 1972 Italian comedy film
The Sin, painting by Franz Stuck
The Sin, painting by Heinrich Lossow
"Chapter 3: The Sin", an episode of web series The Mandalorian

See also

Sin (disambiguation)